Ponda may refer to:
 Ponda Baba, Star Wars character
 Ponda, Goa, a city and a municipal council in the South Goa district of Goa, India
 Ponda taluk, an administrative region of Goa, India
 Ponda (Goa Assembly constituency), one of the 40 constituencies of Goa Legislative Assembly
 Ponda Fort, a fort located in Ponda